"Birthday" is a song by the English rock band the Beatles from their 1968 double album The Beatles (also known as "the White Album"). Written by John Lennon and Paul McCartney,  mainly by McCartney, it is the opening track on the third side of the LP (or the second disc in CD versions of the record). Surviving Beatles Paul McCartney and Ringo Starr performed it for Starr's 70th birthday at Radio City Music Hall on 7 July 2010.

Writing
The song was largely written during a recording session at EMI Studios on 18 September 1968 by John Lennon and Paul McCartney. McCartney: "We thought, 'Why not make something up?' So we got a riff going and arranged it around this riff. So that is 50–50 John and me, made up on the spot and recorded all in the same evening." During the session, the Beatles and the recording crew made a short trip around the corner to McCartney's house to watch the 1956 rock & roll movie The Girl Can't Help It which was being shown for the first time on British television. After the movie they returned to record "Birthday".

George Martin was away so his assistant Chris Thomas produced the session. His memory is that the song was mostly McCartney's: "Paul was the first one in, and he was playing the 'Birthday' riff. Eventually the others arrived, by which time Paul had literally written the song, right there in the studio." Everyone in the studio sang in the chorus and it was 5 am by the time the final mono mix was completed.

Lennon said in his Playboy interview in 1980: "'Birthday' was written in the studio. Just made up on the spot. I think Paul wanted to write a song like 'Happy Birthday Baby', the old fifties hit. But it was sort of made up in the studio. It was a piece of garbage."

"Birthday" begins with an intro drum fill, then moves directly into a blues progression in A (in the form of a guitar riff doubled by the bass) with McCartney singing at the top of his chest voice with Lennon on a lower harmony. After this section, a drum break lasting eight measures brings the song into the middle section, which rests entirely on the dominant. A repeat of the blues progression/guitar riff instrumental section, augmented by piano brings the song into a bridge before returning to a repeat of the first vocal section, this time with the piano accompaniment.

Legacy
Coinciding with the 50th anniversary of its release, Jacob Stolworthy of The Independent listed "Birthday" at number 17 in his ranking of the White Album's 30 tracks. He wrote of the song: "The opening to the second-half [of the album] treads familiar Beatles ground with an improvised riff that could be the record's biggest earworm. Hilariously, Lennon would go on to call [the song] 'garbage'."

Personnel
According to the book accompanying the 2018 box set The Beatles: Super Deluxe Version, the annotation on the tape box from the session offers an alternative line-up that "explodes some myths of who played what":
Paul McCartney – lead vocal, bass, piano
John Lennon – vocals, guitar
George Harrison – guitar, tambourine
Ringo Starr – drums, handclaps
Pattie Harrison – backing vocal
Yoko Ono – backing vocal
Mal Evans – handclaps

Paul McCartney version

Paul McCartney released a live version on 8 October 1990 in the UK, with a US release albeit only as a cassette on 16 October. Originally appearing on Tripping the Live Fantastic, the single reached number 29 on the UK Singles Chart and number 3 in Italy. The B-side was a live version of "Good Day Sunshine". McCartney also released a 12" single and CD single with those songs and two more live tracks, "P.S. Love Me Do" and "Let 'Em In". "P.S. Love Me Do" is a combination of "P.S. I Love You" and "Love Me Do".

Charts

Other versions
Underground Sunshine recorded the song as a single in 1969. Their version was a minor hit in the US, reaching number 19 on the Cash Box chart, number 26 on the Billboard Hot 100, and number 35 in Canada.

Paul Weller covered the song for McCartney's 70th birthday. This version was available for download on 18 June 2012 for one day only. Even with this limited mode of distribution, the track reached number 64 on the UK Singles Chart.

See also
 List of birthday songs

References

External links
 

Songs about birthdays
The Beatles songs
Song recordings produced by Chris Thomas (record producer)
Song recordings produced by George Martin
1968 songs
2012 singles
Songs written by Lennon–McCartney
Songs published by Northern Songs
British hard rock songs
British rock-and-roll songs
Paul McCartney songs
1990 singles
Live singles
Parlophone singles
Capitol Records singles